The United States Air Forces Southern Command is an inactive Major Command of the United States Air Force. It was headquartered at Albrook Air Force Base, Canal Zone, being inactivated on 1 January 1976.

Initially designated Panama Canal Air Force when first established in October 1940, its mission was the defense of the Panama Canal. Later it took on United States Air Force relations, including foreign military sales (FMS) and disaster relief assistance, with the Latin American nations. The command supported disaster relief to countries such as Guatemala, Jamaica, Nicaragua, the Dominican Republic, Panama and Colombia. It also assisted states in Central and South America in purchases of United States military aircraft and trained their technicians in logistics and maintenance for the aircraft.

History

Pre-World War II activities 

The first United States air units arrived in the Canal Zone in February 1917, with the 7th Aero Squadron being organized on 29 March at Ancon. It was equipped with Curtiss JN-4 "Jennys" and Curtiss R-3 and R-4 floatplanes.

The squadron initially came under the control of Headquarters, U.S. Troops, Panama Canal Zone, and beginning on 1 July 1917, Army aviation units were assigned directly to the Panama Canal Department, which was the controlling United States Army headquarters in the Canal Zone. During World War I, the 7th Aero was assigned to patrol for German U-boats offshore of the Canal Zone under direction of Coast Defenses of Cristobal, from 1 June – 15 November 1918.

The 7th Aero Squadron was assigned to several fields during 1917 and 1918, those being Corozal (16 April); Empire (May); Fort Sherman (29 August); Cristobal (March 1918) before finding a permanent home at Coco Walk, which became France Field in May 1918.

A second permanent army airfield, Albrook Field, opened in 1932 due to France Field becoming too small for the numbers of aircraft being assigned to the Canal Zone, as well as having a poor landing surface; offering no room for expansion, and providing little defense for the Pacific entrance to the Panama Canal. A third airfield, Howard Field was built on the Canal Bruja Point Military Reservation, opening on 1 December 1939. By 1940, a rapid increase in the number of flying squadrons in both the Canal Zone as well as in Panama as a result of the pre–World War II mobilization of the Air Corps warranted a new organization, and the Panama Canal Air Force was created as a major command. After several organizational changes and the establishment of the United States Army Air Forces in 1942, Sixth Air Force became the controlling Air Force command authority for USAAF activities in the Caribbean, as well as in Central and South America. Through all these redesignations it was part of the Caribbean Defense Command, (10 February 1941 – 1 November 1947), which was the senior United States Army headquarters in the Canal Zone. The Caribbean Interceptor Command, was the Air Force component (10 February 1941 – 17 October 1941) of the CIC until being inactivated and replaced by VI Interceptor Command.

World War II 

In early 1942 the Nazi Germany's Kriegsmarine, began anti-shipping operations using U-boats in the Caribbean. The subs sank several tankers in the harbor at Sint Nicholaas, Aruba and even shelled an oil refinery on the island. The refineries at the island of Aruba and Curaçao possessed oil from wells in Venezuela, and accounted for one-third of the Allies' supply of gasoline.

The first wartime mission of the newly created Sixth Air Force was to perform antisubmarine operations in the Caribbean and the Gulf of Mexico areas and to cover Allied shipping convoys in the area. The Sixth Air Force expanded throughout the Caribbean and Latin America, stationing units from Cuba in the north to British Guiana and Surinam on the northern coast of South America to protect the Venezuelan oilfields. Air bases were established along the western coast of South America, in Peru, Ecuador as well as in the Galápagos Islands, Panama, Guatemala and Costa Rica. In order to protect the vital Air Transport Command South Atlantic Air Route to Europe and North Africa, Sixth Air Force combat units were stationed in Brazil to patrol the South Atlantic air routes.

Sixth Air Force had the responsibility for tracking down submarine wolfpacks, which consisted of groups of three of more subs attacking Allied shipping using a strategy now known as "Search and Destroy". As most shipping in the Caribbean was not in defensive convoys, aerial surveillance of the area was crucial to their safety. However, in the fall of 1942 the German Navy changed tactics and reduced their submarine activity in the Caribbean region to concentrate its activity on the North Atlantic convoy route and the approaches to northwest Africa. With the withdrawal of submarines from the Caribbean region the Sixth Air Force concentrated its efforts as a striking force on its primary function of guarding against possible attacks on the Panama Canal.

Post-war mission 
With the end of the war, most of the wartime Caribbean air bases used for antisubmarine patrols were returned to civil authorities in late 1945 or early 1946. The Lend-Lease air bases from Great Britain, which were on 99-year leases were reduced to skeleton units and used largely as MATS weather stations. They were all closed for budgetary reasons in 1949.

The postwar Sixth Air Force, redesignated Caribbean Air Command as part of the 1946 USAAF reorganization, and its successor units returned to its prewar mission, the defense of the Panama Canal; support for friendly Latin American air forces, and to provide support to Latin American nations engaged in anti-communist activities during the Cold War. Howard Air Force Base became a focus for military air support, with many surplus USAF aircraft being transferred to Latin American air forces there, as well as the establishment of the Inter-American Air Forces Academy, which provided technical training and education for airmen and officers from approximately 14 Latin American countries.

In the post Vietnam War drawdown of the USAF, the United States Air Forces Southern Command was inactivated in 1976 for budgetary reasons. Most of its functions and resources passed to the Tactical Air Command, which established the USAF Southern Air Division (later 830th Air Division; Air Forces Panama) as the USAF component of the United States Armed Forces in the Panama Canal Zone.

Lineage 
 Established as Panama Canal Air Force on 19 October 1940
 Activated as a Major Command on 20 November 1940
 Redesignated as Caribbean Air Force on 5 August 1941
 Redesignated as 6th Air Force on 18 September 1942
 Redesignated as Caribbean Air Command on 31 July 1946
 Redesignated as United States Air Forces Southern Command on 8 July 1963
 Inactivated as a Major Command on 1 January 1976

Units assigned 

 Commands
 VI Bomber Command, 25 October 1941 – 1 November 1946
 VI Interceptor Command, 17 October 1941
 Redesignated as: VI Fighter Command, May 1942 – October 1943
 XXVI Fighter Command, 6 March 1942 – 25 August 1946
 XXXVI Fighter Command, 21 August 1942 – 30 April 1943
 VI Air Force Service Command, Undetermined (included Panama Air Depot at Albrook Army Airfield)
 Antilles Air Command, 11 July 1941 – 22 January 1949

 Wings
 6th Fighter Wing, 25 August 1946 – 28 July 1948
 13th Composite Wing, 1 November 1940 – 25 October 1941
 19th Composite Wing, 25 January 1933
 Redesignated: 19 Wing on 14 July 1937
 Redesignated: 19 Bombardment Wing on 19 October 1940 – 25 October 1941
 23d Fighter, 25 April – 24 September 1949
 24th Composite, 1967–1976
 36th Fighter Wing, 2 July 1948 – 13 August 1948
 Attached to 6th Fighter Wing, 2–28 July 1948
 5700 Composite, 1948–1949; Air Base, 24 October 1954 – 8 November 1967

 Groups
 25th Bombardment Group, 1 November 1940 – 25 October 1941
 32d Pursuit Group, 1 January 1941 – 18 September 1942
 36 Pursuit Group (Interceptor), 3 June – 25 October 1941
 37th Pursuit Group (Interceptor), 19 November 1940 – 18 September 1942
 53d Fighter Group, 1 January – 6 March 1942

 Squadrons
 4th Tactical Reconnaissance Squadron, 25 August 1946 – 1 February 1948
 20th Transport Squadron, 15 December 1940 – 20 September 1948
 Attached to: 314th Troop Carrier Group [later, 314th Troop Carrier Group, Heavy; 314th Troop Carrier Group, Medium], c. November 1946-16 June 1948

Stations 
 Permanent
 Albrook Air Force Station, Canal Zone, 1932–1976
 France Air Force Base, Canal Zone, 1917–1949
 Howard Air Force Base, Canal Zone, 1939–1976
 Rio Hato Army Air Base, Panama, 1931–1948
 Borinquen (later Ramey) Air Force Base, Puerto Rico, 1936–1971
 (Assigned to Strategic Air Command, 26 May 1949)

 Wartime/Lend-Lease

 Aguadulce Army Airfield, Panama, 1941–1945
 Anton Army Airfield, Panama, 1943
 Arecibo Field, Puerto Rico, 1941–1943
 Atkinson Air Force Base, British Guiana
 APO 602, Antilles Air Command, 1941–1948
 Batista Army Airfield, Cuba, 1942–1943
 APO 632, Caribbean Base Command, Transferred to Air Transport Command, June 1943 
 Beane Air Force Base, Saint Lucia, 1941–1949
 Belém Army Airfield, Brazil, 1941–1945
 Benedict Army Airfield, Saint Croix, 1941–1942
 Calzada Larga Army Airfield, Panama, 1942–1944
 Camaguey Air Base, Cuba, 1942–1944
 Carlsen Air Force Base, Trinidad, 1941–1949
 Chame Army Airfield, Panama, 1942–1945
 Coolidge Air Force Base, Antigua, 1941–1949
 Saint Thomas Airport, Saint Thomas, 1942–1943
 Dakota Army Airfield, Aruba, 1942–1944
 APO 811, Antilles Air Command
 David Army Airfield, Panama, 1941–1945
 Edinburgh Field, Trinidad, 1942-1949
 APO 687, Antilles Air Command

 Guatemala City Air Base, Guatemala, 1941–1949
 Hato Army Airfield, Curaçao, 1942-1945
 APO 812, Antilles Air Command
 La Chorrera Army Airfield, Panama, 1941–1944
 Losey Army Airfield, Puerto Rico, 1941–1944
 Madden Army Airfield, Panama, 1944
 Patilla Point Army Airfield, Panama, 1944
 Piarco Airport, Trinidad, 1941–1943
 Pocri Army Airfield, Panama, 1944
 Salinas Army Airfield, Ecuador, 1942–1943
 APO 661. Sixth AF, Also used by United States Navy
 Seymour Island Army Airfield, Galápagos Islands, 1942–1945
 APO 662. Sixth AF, Closed 26 April 1945
 Talara Army Airfield, Peru, 1942–1943
 APO 817, Sixth AF (Limited use until 1947 by AAFCS) 
 Vernam Air Force Base, Jamaica, 1941–1949
 Waller Air Force Base, Trinidad, 1941–1949
 APO 695/803 Antilles Air Command
 Zandery Army Airfield, Surinam, 1941–1946

References

 Maurer, Maurer (1983). Air Force Combat Units of World War II. Maxwell AFB, Alabama: Office of Air Force History. .
 Ravenstein, Charles A. (1984). Air Force Combat Wings Lineage and Honors Histories 1947–1977. Maxwell AFB, Alabama: Office of Air Force History. .
 ArmyAirforces.Com
 United States Air Forces Southern Command at US Air Force Historical Research Agency

External links
 United States Air Forces Southern Command Factsheet

Major commands of the United States Air Force
Military units and formations established in 1963
Military units and formations disestablished in 1976